Chrysopilus is common, worldwide genus of predatory snipe flies. There are approximately 300 species in the genus, including fossil members that are sometimes found in amber.

Species

Chrysopilus aequicellulatus Frey, 1954
Chrysopilus alaskaensis Hardy, 1949
Chrysopilus albicornis Meijere, 1914
Chrysopilus albobasalis Brunetti, 1920
Chrysopilus albopictus Brunetti, 1909
Chrysopilus alpicola Pokorny, 1886
Chrysopilus alternatus Brunetti, 1920
Chrysopilus amamiensis Nagatomi, 1968
Chrysopilus americanus Schiner, 1868
Chrysopilus amurensis Soboleva, 1986
Chrysopilus andersoni Leonard, 1930
Chrysopilus andicola Lindner, 1924
Chrysopilus andringitrensis Stuckenberg, 1965
Chrysopilus androgynus Paramonov, 1962
Chrysopilus anglicus Cockerell, 1921
Chrysopilus angustifacies Hardy, 1949
Chrysopilus angustifrons Frey, 1954
Chrysopilus ankaratrae Stuckenberg, 1965
Chrysopilus anthracina Bigot, 1887
Chrysopilus antipoda Bigot, 1887
Chrysopilus antongilensis Stuckenberg, 1965
Chrysopilus apicalis Wulp, 1882
Chrysopilus apicimaculatus Yang & Yang, 1991
Chrysopilus arcticus Frey, 1918
Chrysopilus arctiventris James, 1936
Chrysopilus argenteofasciatus Bromley & Curran, 1931
Chrysopilus argenteus Paramonov, 1962
Chrysopilus argentina Shannon, 1927
Chrysopilus argyrophorus Schiner, 1868
Chrysopilus asiliformis (Preyssler, 1791)
Chrysopilus ater Williston, 1896
Chrysopilus aterrimus Williston, 1901
Chrysopilus atricornis Stuckenberg, 1965
Chrysopilus aymara Lindner, 1924
Chrysopilus azurinus Frey, 1954
Chrysopilus balbii Santos & Amorim, 2007
Chrysopilus basalis Walker, 1860
Chrysopilus basifasciatus Paramonov, 1962
Chrysopilus basiflavus Yang & Yang, 1992
Chrysopilus basilaris (Say, 1823)
Chrysopilus beameri Hardy, 1949
Chrysopilus bequaerti Curran, 1931
Chrysopilus betsileorum Stuckenberg, 1965
Chrysopilus bicoloratus Webb, 2012
Chrysopilus binoculatus Edwards, 1915
Chrysopilus binotata Loew, 1869
Chrysopilus birmanensis Brunetti, 1920
Chrysopilus bisectus Oldroyd, 1939
Chrysopilus bistriatipennis Brunetti, 1927
Chrysopilus boettcheri Frey, 1954
Chrysopilus brunneabdominalis Webb, 2012
Chrysopilus brunneifrons Kertész, 1902
Chrysopilus caducus (Wiedemann, 1828)
Chrysopilus calchaqui Coscarón & Coscarón, 1995
Chrysopilus caligatus Santos & Amorim, 2007
Chrysopilus caliginosus Webb, 2012
Chrysopilus calopterus Schiner, 1868
Chrysopilus camargoi Santos & Amorim, 2007
Chrysopilus capillosus Santos & Amorim, 2007
Chrysopilus chazeaui Webb, 2012
Chrysopilus choui Yang & Yang, 1989
Chrysopilus clarapex Frey, 1954
Chrysopilus claricinctus Lindner, 1923
Chrysopilus clarus (Walker, 1852)
Chrysopilus clemendoti Stuckenberg, 1965
Chrysopilus cochinensis Brunetti, 1920
Chrysopilus coeruleothorax Lindner, 1925
Chrysopilus cognatus Stuckenberg, 1965
Chrysopilus collessi Paramonov, 1962
Chrysopilus commoni Paramonov, 1962
Chrysopilus conjunctus Yang, Dong & Zhang, 2016
Chrysopilus connexus Johnson, 1912
Chrysopilus consanguineus Schiner, 1868
Chrysopilus correctus Osten Sacken, 1882
Chrysopilus cricosphaerota Speiser, 1914
Chrysopilus cristatus (Fabricius, 1775)
Chrysopilus cubensis Curran, 1931
Chrysopilus dauricus Frey, 1954
Chrysopilus davisi Johnson, 1912
Chrysopilus decisus (Walker, 1857)
Chrysopilus decoratus Meijere, 1911
Chrysopilus delpontei Shannon, 1927
Chrysopilus depressiconus Frey, 1954
Chrysopilus dilatus Cresson, 1919
Chrysopilus diplostigma Bezzi, 1916
Chrysopilus ditissimus Bezzi, 1912
Chrysopilus dives Loew, 1871
Chrysopilus divisus Hardy, 1949
Chrysopilus donato Curran, 1931
Chrysopilus dubius Krivosheina & Sidorenko, 2006
Chrysopilus duplicatus Krivosheina & Sidorenko, 2006
Chrysopilus edgari Paramonov, 1962
Chrysopilus egregius Meijere, 1919
Chrysopilus elegans Schiner, 1868
Chrysopilus erythrophthalmus Loew, 1840
Chrysopilus erythrophthalmus ssp. dudai Krivosheina, 2006
Chrysopilus everti Webb, 2012
Chrysopilus facetticus Paramonov, 1962
Chrysopilus fasciatus (Say, 1823)
Chrysopilus fascipennis (Brunetti, 1920)
Chrysopilus fasciventris Curran, 1931
Chrysopilus fenestratus Bezzi, 1912
Chrysopilus ferruginosus (Wiedemann, 1819)
Chrysopilus ferruginosus ssp. burmanicus Frey, 1954
Chrysopilus ferruginosus ssp. dimidiatus Frey, 1954
Chrysopilus ferruginosus ssp. philippinus Frey, 1954
Chrysopilus fijiensis Webb, 2006
Chrysopilus fimbriatus Stuckenberg, 1997
Chrysopilus flaveolus (Meigen, 1820)
Chrysopilus flavibarbis Adams, 1904
Chrysopilus flavicomus Krivosheina & Sidorenko, 2006
Chrysopilus flavifemur Yang, Dong & Zhang, 2016
Chrysopilus flaviscutellus Yang & Yang, 1989
Chrysopilus flavopilosus Brunetti, 1920
Chrysopilus flavopunctatus Brunetti, 1909
Chrysopilus foeda Loew, 1861
Chrysopilus frankmcalpinei Webb, 2012
Chrysopilus fulvidus Bigot, 1891
Chrysopilus fuscicinctus Brunetti, 1927
Chrysopilus fuscipes Bigot, 1887
Chrysopilus gansuensis Yang & Yang, 1991
Chrysopilus gemmiferus Frey, 1954
Chrysopilus georgianus Hardy, 1949
Chrysopilus gilvipennis Edwards, 1919
Chrysopilus golbachi Coscarón & Coscarón, 1995
Chrysopilus grandis Yang & Yang, 1993
Chrysopilus gratiosus Paramonov, 1962
Chrysopilus gravelyi Brunetti, 1920
Chrysopilus gressitti (Nagatomi, 1982)
Chrysopilus griffithi Johnson, 1897
Chrysopilus griseipennis Bezzi, 1912
Chrysopilus griveaudi Stuckenberg, 1965
Chrysopilus guangxiensis Yang & Yang, 1992
Chrysopilus guianicus Curran, 1931
Chrysopilus guttipennis Walker, 1861
Chrysopilus hakusanus Nagatomi, 1978
Chrysopilus helvolus (Meigen, 1820)
Chrysopilus heroicus Paramonov, 1962
Chrysopilus howei Paramonov, 1962
Chrysopilus huashanus Yang & Yang, 1989
Chrysopilus hubeiensis Yang & Yang, 1991
Chrysopilus humeralis Brunetti, 1912
Chrysopilus humilis Loew, 1874
Chrysopilus hyalinus Santos & Amorim, 2007
Chrysopilus hybridus Lindner, 1924
Chrysopilus iani Paramonov, 1962
Chrysopilus illustris Frey, 1954
Chrysopilus imitator Paramonov, 1962
Chrysopilus impar (Walker, 1861)
Chrysopilus incidens Curran, 1927
Chrysopilus indistinctus Yang, Dong & Zhang, 2016
Chrysopilus indris Stuckenberg, 1965
Chrysopilus infuscatus Leonard, 1930
Chrysopilus inka Lindner, 1924
Chrysopilus insularis Schiner, 1868
Chrysopilus intermedius Bezzi, 1895
Chrysopilus invalidus Williston, 1901
Chrysopilus irroratus Schiner, 1868
Chrysopilus irwini Webb, 2012
Chrysopilus itoi Nagatomi, 1958
Chrysopilus ivontakae Stuckenberg, 1965
Chrysopilus jamaicensis Johnson, 1894
Chrysopilus jianfengensis Yang, Dong & Zhang, 2016
Chrysopilus keiseri Stuckenberg, 1965
Chrysopilus kimoroensis Stuckenberg, 1965
Chrysopilus kincaidi Hardy, 1949
Chrysopilus komurae Matsumura, 1911
Chrysopilus kurentzovi Krivosheina & Sidorenko, 2007
Chrysopilus kyotoensis Frey, 1954
Chrysopilus laetus Zetterstedt, 1842
Chrysopilus lateralis Oldroyd, 1939
Chrysopilus latifrons Bezzi, 1898
Chrysopilus latipennis Stuckenberg, 1965
Chrysopilus latistigma Curran, 1931
Chrysopilus latus Brunetti, 1920
Chrysopilus leleji Krivosheina & Sidorenko, 2008
Chrysopilus lemur Stuckenberg, 1965
Chrysopilus leonardi Curran, 1931
Chrysopilus leptiformis Kertész, 1902
Chrysopilus lii Yang, Yang & Nagatomi, 1997
Chrysopilus lilianae Soboleva, 1986
Chrysopilus limpidipennis Lindner, 1931
Chrysopilus lineatus Lindner, 1929
Chrysopilus lokobiensis Stuckenberg, 1965
Chrysopilus longipalpis Hardy, 1949
Chrysopilus lucifer (Walker, 1852)
Chrysopilus lucimaculatus Yang & Yang, 1992
Chrysopilus luctuosus Brunetti, 1909
Chrysopilus luculentus Nagatomi, 1968
Chrysopilus ludens Loew, 1861
Chrysopilus lugubrinus Meijere, 1924
Chrysopilus lupinus Osten Sacken, 1881
Chrysopilus luteolus (Fallén, 1814)
Chrysopilus mackerrasi Paramonov, 1962
Chrysopilus macularis Curran, 1931
Chrysopilus maculipennis Walker, 1856
Chrysopilus madecassus Stuckenberg, 1965
Chrysopilus madecassus ssp. merinanus Stuckenberg, 1965
Chrysopilus maerens Loew, 1873
Chrysopilus magnipennis Brunetti, 1909
Chrysopilus malaisei Frey, 1954
Chrysopilus mandjelia Webb, 2012
Chrysopilus marmoratus Brunetti, 1909
Chrysopilus marumbiensis Coscarón, 2005
Chrysopilus matsumurai Nagatomi, 1968
Chrysopilus mcalpinei Paramonov, 1962
Chrysopilus megacephalus Stuckenberg, 1965
Chrysopilus melinus Webb, 2012
Chrysopilus mexicanus Bellardi, 1861
Chrysopilus microphallus Santos & Amorim, 2007
Chrysopilus modestus Loew, 1872
Chrysopilus mojiangensis Yang & Yang, 1990
Chrysopilus montanorum Paramonov, 1962
Chrysopilus moramangensis Stuckenberg, 1965
Chrysopilus morimotoi Nagatomi, 1968
Chrysopilus mundus Stuckenberg, 1965
Chrysopilus mutabilis Stuckenberg, 1965
Chrysopilus nagatomii Yang & Yang, 1991
Chrysopilus nanus Williston, 1901
Chrysopilus neimongolicus Yang, 1991
Chrysopilus nemoris Stuckenberg, 1965
Chrysopilus nigra Bellardi, 1862
Chrysopilus nigricauda Beling, 1873
Chrysopilus nigriculus Krivosheina & Sidorenko, 2006
Chrysopilus nigrifacies Nagatomi, 1968
Chrysopilus nigrimaculatus Yang, 1991
Chrysopilus nigrimarginatus Yang & Yang, 1990
Chrysopilus nigripalpis Bezzi, 1912
Chrysopilus nigrocinctus Brunetti, 1927
Chrysopilus nigropilosus Yang, Zhu & Gao, 2005
Chrysopilus nitidiventris Tonnoir, 1927
Chrysopilus niveofarinosus Frey, 1954
Chrysopilus nobilipennis Frey, 1954
Chrysopilus norrisi Paramonov, 1962
Chrysopilus noumea Webb, 2012
Chrysopilus nubecula (Fallén, 1814)
Chrysopilus nudus Cresson, 1919
Chrysopilus obscuralatus Yang & Yang, 1989
Chrysopilus obscuratus Meijere, 1914
Chrysopilus obscuribarba Loew, 1869
Chrysopilus obscuripes Speiser, 1923
Chrysopilus okutanii Nagatomi, 1968
Chrysopilus opacifrons Meijere, 1911
Chrysopilus opalescens Brunetti, 1920
Chrysopilus opalizans Meijere, 1913
Chrysopilus ornatipennis Brunetti, 1909
Chrysopilus pallipes Loew, 1869
Chrysopilus pallipilosus Yang & Yang, 1992
Chrysopilus palparis Loew, 1869
Chrysopilus panamensis Curran, 1931
Chrysopilus paradoxus Krivosheina & Sidorenko, 2008
Chrysopilus parvus Yang, Yang & Nagatomi, 1997
Chrysopilus peninsularis Lee & Suh, 2021
Chrysopilus peninsularis Lee & Suh, 2021
Chrysopilus peruanus Kertész, 1902
Chrysopilus petersoni Webb, 2012
Chrysopilus phaeopterus Santos & Amorim, 2007
Chrysopilus philippii Lindner, 1924
Chrysopilus pilosus Leonard, 1930
Chrysopilus pingquanus Yang, Yang & Nagatomi, 1997
Chrysopilus pingxianganus Yang & Yang, 1992
Chrysopilus plaumanni Santos & Amorim, 2007
Chrysopilus plautifrons Webb, 2012
Chrysopilus plebeius Williston, 1901
Chrysopilus poecilopterus Bezzi, 1912
Chrysopilus polypilosus Yang, Dong & Zhang, 2016
Chrysopilus praetiosa Loew, 1869
Chrysopilus propinquus Kertész, 1902
Chrysopilus proximus (Walker, 1848)
Chrysopilus puella Williston, 1901
Chrysopilus pulla Loew, 1869
Chrysopilus quadratus (Say, 1823)
Chrysopilus rhagiodes Bromley & Curran, 1931
Chrysopilus rotundipennis Loew, 1861
Chrysopilus ruiliensis Yang & Yang, 1990
Chrysopilus saffranus (Bigot, 1887)
Chrysopilus sarramea Webb, 2012
Chrysopilus sauteri Bezzi, 1907
Chrysopilus schinusei Lindner, 1924
Chrysopilus schlingeri Webb, 2006
Chrysopilus segmentatus Brunetti, 1909
Chrysopilus semipictus Santos & Amorim, 2007
Chrysopilus sericeus Bromley & Curran, 1931
Chrysopilus shaanxiensis Yang & Yang, 1989
Chrysopilus shananus Frey, 1954
Chrysopilus shewelli Webb, 2012
Chrysopilus shibuyai Nagatomi, 1968
Chrysopilus sicula Loew, 1869
Chrysopilus sigillatus Lindner, 1930
Chrysopilus silvaticus Nagatomi, 1968
Chrysopilus silvicola Nagatomi, 1968
Chrysopilus similis Brunetti, 1920
Chrysopilus simonovi Krivosheina & Sidorenko, 2006
Chrysopilus simplex Meijere, 1904
Chrysopilus smaragdinus Kertész, 1902
Chrysopilus sobolevae Makarkin & Sidorenko, 2001
Chrysopilus sogai Stuckenberg, 1965
Chrysopilus sordidus Brunetti, 1920
Chrysopilus splendidus (Meigen, 1820)
Chrysopilus squamithorax Brunetti, 1927
Chrysopilus stigma Brunetti, 1909
Chrysopilus stigmatias (Bigot, 1887)
Chrysopilus stigmaticus Cockerell, 1921
Chrysopilus strigipennis Meijere, 1914
Chrysopilus stylata Walker, 1864
Chrysopilus subalpicola Krivosheina, 2006
Chrysopilus subamurensis Krivosheina & Sidorenko, 2006
Chrysopilus subaquilis Nagatomi, 1968
Chrysopilus subauratus Krivosheina, 2006
Chrysopilus subpingquanus Krivosheina & Sidorenko, 2007
Chrysopilus subsplendidus Krivosheina, 2006
Chrysopilus subtrimaculatus Krivosheina & Sidorenko, 2007
Chrysopilus subugensis Krivosheina & Sidorenko, 2006
Chrysopilus sucini Stuckenberg, 1965
Chrysopilus suomianus Szilády, 1934
Chrysopilus superbus Stuckenberg, 1965
Chrysopilus tanakai Nagatomi, 1978
Chrysopilus tasmaniensis White, 1914
Chrysopilus tenggeranus Frey, 1934
Chrysopilus teskeyi Webb, 2012
Chrysopilus testaceipes Bigot, 1887
Chrysopilus testaceus Loew, 1858
Chrysopilus thoracicus (Fabricius, 1805)
Chrysopilus tomentosus Bigot, 1887
Chrysopilus tonnoiri Paramonov, 1962
Chrysopilus torrentium Thomas, 1978
Chrysopilus trifasciata Walker, 1860
Chrysopilus trimaculatus Yang & Yang, 1989
Chrysopilus tsacasi Thomas, 1979
Chrysopilus tuckeri Bezzi, 1926
Chrysopilus turkestanus Lindner, 1931
Chrysopilus ugensis Nagatomi, 1968
Chrysopilus ungaranensis Meijere, 1911
Chrysopilus unicolor Brunetti, 1909
Chrysopilus unicus Curran, 1931
Chrysopilus vacillans Walker, 1858
Chrysopilus vadoni Stuckenberg, 1965
Chrysopilus valdivianus Philippi, 1865
Chrysopilus variipilus Krivosheina & Sidorenko, 2006
Chrysopilus varius Kertész, 1902
Chrysopilus velutinus Loew, 1861
Chrysopilus vespertinus Stuckenberg, 1965
Chrysopilus villosissimus Paramonov, 1962
Chrysopilus virtuosus Nagatomi, 1958
Chrysopilus vitreus Santos & Amorim, 2007
Chrysopilus vockerothi Webb, 2012
Chrysopilus waigiensis (Bigot, 1887)
Chrysopilus wirthi Stuckenberg, 1997
Chrysopilus woodi Webb, 2012
Chrysopilus wuzhishanus Yang, Dong & Zhang, 2016
Chrysopilus xanthocromus Yang & Yang, 1990
Chrysopilus xanthopus Hardy, 1949
Chrysopilus xizangensis Yang, 1991
Chrysopilus yerburyi Brunetti, 1920
Chrysopilus yezonis Nagatomi, 1968
Chrysopilus yunnanensis Yang & Yang, 1990
Chrysopilus zanjensis Stuckenberg, 1965
Chrysopilus zinovjevi Krivosheina & Sidorenko, 2007

References

External links

 Mark van Veens' page on European Chrysopilus

Rhagionidae
Articles containing video clips
Taxa named by Pierre-Justin-Marie Macquart
Brachycera genera